Irshat Yunirovich Fakhritdinov (1 February 1965 – 22 October 2021) was a Russian politician.

Life
A member of the United Russia party, he served in the State Duma from 2007 to 2016.

Fakhritdinov died from COVID-19 on 22 October 2021, during the COVID-19 pandemic in Russia. He was 56 years old.

References

1965 births
2021 deaths
Sixth convocation members of the State Duma (Russian Federation)
People from Ishimbaysky District
Deaths from the COVID-19 pandemic in Russia
United Russia politicians
Soviet military personnel of the Soviet–Afghan War
Recipients of the Medal of the Order "For Merit to the Fatherland" II class
Recipients of the Order of the Red Star